Rufino may refer to:

Rufino (given name)
Rufino Family, Filipino family 
Rufinus of Assisi, Italian saint sometimes known as Rufino
Rufino, Santa Fe, Argentina
Rufino Plaza, Tallest skyscraper in the Philippines

See also
Ruffino, a wine producer based in the Tuscany region of Italy
 Rufinus (disambiguation)